Jokūbas Minkevičius (27 March 19215 May 1996) was a Lithuanian politician, born in Ufa, Bashkir ASSR.  In 1990 he was among those who signed the Act of the Re-Establishment of the State of Lithuania.

References

1921 births
1996 deaths
Politicians from Ufa
Members of the Seimas
20th-century Lithuanian philosophers
Soviet politicians